Soultzmatt is a commune in the Haut-Rhin department in Grand Est in north-eastern France.

Its vineyards produce one of the finest Alsacian wines: the Grand Cru .

See also
 Communes of the Haut-Rhin department

References

Communes of Haut-Rhin
Haut-Rhin communes articles needing translation from French Wikipedia